Pindrop Security is an American information security company that provides risk scoring for phone calls to detect fraud and authenticate callers. The company analyzes 147 different features of a phone call that helps identify the uniqueness of a device and attaches it to a caller. In 2015, Pindrop screened more than 360 million calls.

Pindrop was a concept developed at the Georgia Institute of Technology. Vijay Balasubramaniyan, a computer science graduate from India studying the traits of wanted versus unwanted phone calls, teamed with his thesis advisor Mustaque Ahamad to launch a VentureLab project called Telineage in September 2010. Balasubramaniyan, Ahamad and two colleagues presented an ACM paper on what would become Pindrop's core technology.

Balasubramaniyan's idea was to acoustically fingerprint phone calls and associate that data with the phone number. In 2011, he and Paul Judge founded Pindrop as a voice security company that combats fraud by analyzing and assigning risk to phone calls.

The company obtained a license to the intellectual property from Georgia Tech Research Corporation, while VentureLab supported the company for a Phase I commercialization grant from the Georgia Research Alliance. In the same year, Pindrop placed second in Startup Riot, was named one of Top 40 Most Innovative Companies in Georgia by the Technology Association of Georgia (TAG), and won the TAG/GRA Business Launch Competition. Under the name Telineage, Pindrop also won National Science Foundation SBIR Phase I and Phase II Awards.

In 2012, Pindrop raised $1 million in funding from Andreessen Horowitz, other venture capital firms and several angel investors. In June 2013, the company closed a $11 million Series A investment round led by Andreessen Horowitz and Citi Ventures, and also including Felicis Ventures and Redpoint, using the funds to scale up engineering, operations, sales and marketing in the US, Canada and Europe. In February 2015, Pindrop raised $35 million in a Series B round led by Institutional Venture Partners.

Their employee headcount totaled 70 at the beginning of 2015, which increased to 100 by June. In July, Pindrop released Fraud Detection System 2.4 (FDS), providing new tools for fraud analysts and call center technologists. Pindrop's 2015 revenue tripled, while its customer base doubled.

Pindrop Security raised another $75 million in 2016. Google Capital led the Series C round, with participation from Andreessen Horowitz, GV and others, bringing the company's total funding to $122 million. It was a rare case of both Google Capital and Google Ventures (now GV) investing in the same startup.

Services 

In 2015, Federal Trade Commission singled out robocalling as the No. 1 consumer complaint in the U.S., with about 170,000 complaints a month. A Pindrop Security report The State of Phone Fraud 2014-2015: a Global, Cross-Industry Threat found that 86 million calls per month in the U.S. are phone scams. It also found that 1 in 6 phone numbers calling a consumer is a robocaller and 2.5 percent of U.S. phones receive at least one robocall per week. Such calls create the loss of more than $20 billion annually in the US alone.

The "acoustic fingerprinting" technology integrates with companies internal systems and identifies people's voices, locations, and devices. This is added to a database for future reference and to help separate legitimate callers from scammers.

The company listens for 147 different features that help identify the uniqueness of a device and attach it to a caller. To create metadata, Pindrop Security analyzed millions of phone calls in telecom databases from around the world and used machine learning to turn that information into usable content. By analyzing both the audio of a call and the metadata it has about a caller, the phoneprint reveals whether the caller is using a cell, landline, or VoIP phone; where the call really is coming from; and whether the caller has been seen before. It looks for evidence of frequency filters and codec artifacts, for example, and analyzes the calls for packet loss and dropped frames. In packet loss, "pindrop"-sized bits of audio drop out, which is where the company's name came from.

Based on the analysis, the service generates a risk profile and a score for each call. Analyzing millions of samples from call centers, it can identify specific criminal groups. An example is a criminal group based in Nigeria nicknamed "West Africa One." According to Pindrop, the West Africa One has 12 members and Pindrop has assessed the skill levels of each of the 12 members.

Other tools 

Pindrop has additional tools that update the company's fraudulent call database with relevant information. Phoneypot is a telephone honeypot with about a quarter-million phone numbers that are not being used by real people, which Pindrop uses for research. Workers enter the numbers into sweepstakes and online databases to collect data from millions of calls from robo-callers, debt collectors, and telemarketers. Among trends, the researchers found that older phone numbers attracted more calls than newer ones.

Topic Modeler is a proprietary online complaint collection tool that aggregates data on suspicious numbers from complaint sites, online communities, and web forums. Fraud Detection System (FDS) combines the company's Phoneprint technology and voice biometrics capabilities with an analytics-driven, unified workspace to more quickly detect and curb phone fraud. It allows fraud analysts to collect call samples, playback and annotate calls, query the system, and investigate possible patterns of fraud, all in one platform.

Ahamad and other researchers won an award on PhoneyPot at the Internet Society's 2015 Conference.

References

External links 

Software companies established in 2011
Companies based in Atlanta